Claude Adam (born 21 August 1958 in Ettelbruck) is a Luxembourgian politician and member of the Déi Gréng, Luxembourg's Green Party. He was a member of the Chamber of Deputies from 2004 until his resignation in 2018. Adam has also been a member of the municipal council in Mersch since 1999.

References

Living people
1958 births
People from Ettelbruck
The Greens (Luxembourg) politicians
Members of the Chamber of Deputies (Luxembourg)
20th-century Luxembourgian politicians
21st-century Luxembourgian politicians
Luxembourgian educators